Gojko Johansen Barjamovic is Senior Lecturer on Assyriology at Harvard University. He is a specialist in the political and social history of Assyria in the 2nd and 1st millennia BC, and particularly trade and the development of early markets. He has also worked on absolute dating and the chronology of the  Ancient Near East. He was a member of the team that used statistical methods to interrogate the records of ancient merchants found at Kültepe/Kanesh near the modern Turkish city of Kayseri to locate the probable location of ancient cities.

Selected publications
 A Historical Geography of Anatolia in the Old Assyrian Colony Period (2011).
 Ups and Downs at Kanesh (2012), co-authored with T. Hertel and M.T. Larsen.
 Problems of Canonicity and Identity Formation in Ancient Egypt and Mesopotamia (2016). (Editor with Kim Ryholt).
 Integrated Tree-Ring-Radiocarbon High-Resolution Timeframe to Resolve Earlier Second Millennium BCE Mesopotamian Chronology (2016). Sturt Manning, Carol B. Griggs, Brita Lorentzen, Gojko Barjamovic, Christopher Ramsey, Bernd Kromer and Eva Maria Wild.
 Trade, Merchants, and the Lost Cities of the Bronze Age (2017). Gojko Barjamovic, Thomas Chaney, Kerem Coşar and Ali Hortaçsu.

References

External links

Harvard University faculty
University of Copenhagen alumni
American Assyriologists
Living people
Year of birth missing (living people)